Sandy Bay Mountain, known officially in Quebec as Mont Sandy Stream, is a mountain located on the Canada–United States border, with a height of  above sea level. The northeastern part of the mountain is in Somerset County, Maine, while the southwestern part is in Saint-Ludger, Quebec. There, it is unofficially known as Mont Bélanger.

Geography
The mountain is flanked to the southeast by Slidedown Mountain.

Hydrography
Sandy Bay Mountain stands on the borders of three major rivers watersheds. The north side of Sandy Bay Mountain drains into the South Branch of the Penobscot River, then into the West Branch, the main stem of the Penobscot, and into Penobscot Bay. The east side of the mountain drains into the West Branch of Sandy Stream, then into the Moose River, the Kennebec River, and the Gulf of Maine. On its southwest side, the mountain drains into Ruisseau Noir, then into the Rivière du Loup, the Chaudière River, the Saint Lawrence River, and finally the Gulf of Saint Lawrence.

See also 
 List of mountains in Maine

References

Mountains of Quebec under 1000 metres
Landforms of Estrie
Canada–United States border
Mountains of Somerset County, Maine
International mountains of North America
Mountains of Maine